Streptomyces alboflavus is a bacterium species from the genus  of Streptomyces which produces oxytetracycline, tetracycline and desertomycin A.

See also 
 List of Streptomyces species

References

Further reading

External links
Type strain of Streptomyces alboflavus at BacDive – the Bacterial Diversity Metadatabase

alboflavus
Bacteria described in 1948